The Samyang 16mm f/2.0 ED AS UMC CS is an interchangeable camera lens announced by Samyang on June 13, 2013.

References
http://www.dpreview.com/products/samyang/lenses/samyang_16_2/specifications

Camera lenses introduced in 2013
016